The 1st Royal Naval Brigade was an infantry brigade of the Royal Navy which was formed from excess naval reserve personnel.  The brigade was formed in August 1914 and assigned to the 63rd (Royal Naval) Division after that division's formation in September 1914 and served on the Western Front and during the Gallipoli campaign, until July 1916 when it was broken up.  The brigade was formed once more for a few days, but once again disbanded following the division's absorption into the Army's order of battle.

Background 
Before the beginning of the First World War, plans for a 'naval land force' were drawn up on the recommendation of the Committee for Imperial Defence: "[in the event of war] a force of Royal Marines would be formed under the control of the Admiralty, to be known as the 'Advanced Base Force'".  When war was declared, this project was put into operation, and a brigade of marines, known as the Royal Marine Brigade (later the 3rd (Royal Marine) Brigade) was established with its administrative headquarters based in London.

Formation 

By the time of mobilisation, the British Army could only muster six infantry divisions (of regulars) and two cavalry divisions.  To meet this shortfall, troops were withdrawn from overseas postings and the Dominions as reinforcements for the expeditionary force sent to France.  New volunteer units were also formed and trained, such as the local 'Pals battalions'.  However, a new division of naval reservists and Marines surplus to the fleet would undoubtedly be a great help, with Herbert Kitchener, 1st Earl Kitchener, stating during a meeting of the House of Lords that "... Their presence in the field will be very welcome, for their fighting qualities are well known.".

In August 1914, as part of the mobilisation of the British Armed Forces following the German invasion of Belgium, the Royal Navy and Royal Marines Light Infantry, were organised into battalions and 'divisions'.  These forces were organised along the same lines as their counterparts in the army, except for small details such as the rank of the commanding officer, and lack of bands, etc.  The forces on long being organised into battalions were now organised into eight battalions, along with an artillery battalion and five battalions belonging to the Royal Marines, but were still sitting idly by.  In addition, large numbers of naval reservists were available and much above those required for manning the fleet, so on 16 August 1914, the Admiralty decided to form two naval brigades, which were grouped with the Royal Marine Brigade into the 'Royal Naval Division'.  The new division maintained an administrative headquarters at the Admiralty Building, but no operational headquarters was established until late August, after which it was based in Dover.

In accordance with the expansion of the battalions, 1st Naval Brigade, was established on 20 August 1914 at the Plymouth Naval Base.  The new brigade was initially organised with four battalions from local naval stations and ships, and named after according to where the majority of its personnel came from.  Each was to comprise four battalions, each of 880 men and to be organised in 16 'double companies' of 220 men.

The initial organisation, however, proved to be unmanageable, and each battalion was reorganised into the following structure: 28 x Petty Officers from the Royal Navy, 48 x Petty Officers from the Royal Fleet Reserve, 424 x Petty Officers, Leading Seamen, and Seamen from the Royal Naval Volunteer Reserve, 250 x 'Stokers' from the Royal Fleet Reserve, and 187 x Seamen under 30 years old from the Royal Naval Reserve.  This left each battalion with personnel coming from across the navy, leaving a total of 937 sailors.

Because of the quick formation of the naval brigades, a new camp ground was hastily constructed from 700 tents to supplement the 170 marine tents already at hand in Deal in Kent.  Sailors from the Royal Naval Volunteer Reserve were instructed to bring their own rifles, while arrangements were made to issue 4,000 rifles for the Royal Naval Reserve and Royal Fleet Reserve.  These were of the old Lee–Enfield Bolt-action rifles, but orders were placed for the newer short type to be delivered at the earliest possible moment.  Vickers received an order for 40 Maxim Machine-Guns, to be ready in 10 days; four would be issued to each battalion, with four kept in reserve.  Each company therefore continued a machine-gun section, and each of the three brigades was to form a field ambulance column.

Belgium 

On 4 October 1914, the two newly formed naval brigades received orders to embark at the Port of Dover for a move to France.  On the morning of 5 October, the brigades arrived in Dunkirk.  The brigade was embarked once more onboard two troop trains, and a shore train, arriving in Antwerp, Belgium at 02:30 in the morning on 6 October.  Immediately upon arrival the brigade joined the Royal Marine Brigade at the Antwerp defensive line.  The Siege of Antwerp had been raging since 28 September, and by 6 October the Belgian garrison was close to surrender.  During the afternoon of the 6th, the brigade was detached to the right flank of the Royal Marine Brigade.  This position however, was seen as untenable and during the night of 6-7 October, the (now organised) Royal Naval Division withdrew and occupied the 2nd line of trenches.  The 1st Naval Brigade was dug in around the positions of Forts No. 1-8, with brigade holding the far left flank.

At around midnight on the 7-8 October, a heavy German artillery bombardment opened up on the forts, trenches, and now the centre of the city, and by 18:00 at night on the 8th, Forts No. 1, 2, and 4 had all fallen or been destroyed.  The situation, looking increasingly hopeless, meant a retreat from Antwerp was not only possible, but not unavoidable.  During the night of the 8th-9th October, the division crossed the Scheldt river and marched to Sint-Gillis-Waas.

On 9 October, the division was once again embarked on trains, now heading for Ostend.  However, around 1,500 men (almost all from the 1st Naval Brigade, including its commander), failed to break through and had to cross the Dutch frontier where, on the 9th, they were interned in accordance with that country's neutrality laws.

Home Service 
After a large amount of the 1st Naval Brigade had been captured trying to escape from Belgium, the division was embarked on ships in Ostend and reached Dover on the 11th October.  For a short time, the division was scattered around Kent and Sussex, finding accommodations wherever available, the Royal Marine battalions however returned to their various barracks.

On 27 November 1914, the division began to once again consolidate, arriving at Blandford Camp, and by the end of January 1915 the move was complete, with the entire division now grouped at the camp and in the nearby town of Blandford Forum.

Mediterranean 

In February 1915, the Royal Naval Division received orders to embark for an "operation in the Mediterranean".  The Royal Marines Brigade left Devonport on 6 February, reaching the island of Lemnos on 24 February.  The 1st and 2nd Naval Brigades however remained at Blandford for a short time for an inspection by King George V on 24 February.  Right after the inspection, the two brigades were embarked on trains and arrived in Avonmouth.  However, the 1st Naval 'Brigade' was now only the strength of one battalion, as the 2nd (Hawke), 3rd (Benbow), and 4th (Collingwood) Battalions, in addition to the recently joined 1st and 2nd Royal Naval Field Engineer Companies were left behind to finish their landing training.  On 1 March 1915, they were embarked at Avonmouth and arrived at Port Said in British Egypt on 29 March.  Between the landing and 5th April, the brigade was redesignated as the 1st (Royal Naval) Brigade, though it later dropped the prefix '(Royal Naval)' on 2 August 1915.  In addition, the brigade was reorganised with the 3rd (Benbow) Battalion, disbanded on 9 June; 4th (Collingwood) Battalion left on 30 May; 5th (Nelson) Battalion, joined by the 5th of April; and 12th (Deal) Battalion joining on 12th March.

On 5 April 1915, the division began to re-embark on ships, and on 8 April left Egypt for Mudros, Kingdom of Greece.  By 16 April, the division had concentrated around Trebuki Bay, Skyros and on 23 April the division sailed for the Gulf of Xeros.  The division carried out feint landings at Bulair on 24 April, while the main body of the division landed near what would become known as Anzac Cove.  On 27 April the entire division was disembarked and set up position at Cape Helles.

The division was shipped to Egypt and fought at the Battle of Gallipoli at Anzac Cove and Cape Helles. Casualties before the campaign began included Rupert Brooke, who died at sea from an infected mosquito bite on 23 April 1915. The RND was one of two British divisions (the other being the regular 29th Division) at the Gallipoli landings. Eleven troopships and Canopus, Dartmouth and Doris, two destroyers and trawlers rendezvoused off Bulair before dawn and the warships began a day-long bombardment, just after daybreak. A destroyer made a close pass off the beach and later on, ships' boats were swung out from the troopships and lines of eight cutters pulled by a trawler made as if to land. In the late afternoon men began to embark on the boats, which headed for the shore just before dark and returned after night fell. During the night Lieutenant-Commander Bernard Freyberg swam ashore and lit flares along the beach, crept inland and observed the Ottoman defences. Freyberg found that the defences were dummies and returned safely to report. Just after dawn, the decoy force sailed south to join the main landings, coming ashore on 30 April.

The division was finally relieved from the peninsula during the Evacuation from Gallipoli on 9th January 1916,

Finally, on 2 July 1916 the brigade HQ was redesignated as the 3rd (Royal Marine) Brigade,  which on 7 July was itself redesignated as the 1st (Royal Naval) Brigade once again.  On 19 July 1916, to bring the brigade in-line with the British Army, it became the 188th Brigade.

Order of battle 
The order of battle of the brigade during the war was as follows:

 Brigade Headquarters
 1st (Drake) Battalion – left in May 1916
 2nd (Hawke) Battalion – left in May 1916
 3rd (Benbow) Battalion – disbanded 9 June 1915
 4th (Collingwood) Battalion – left 30 May 1915
 5th (Nelson) Battalion – joined in April 1915 and left in May 1916
 7th (Hood) Battalion – joined in August 1915, split into 1/Hood and 2/Hood battalions between 1 June–5 July 1916
 12th (Deal) Battalion – joined on 12 March 1915 and left on 30 May 1915
 2/4th (City of London) Battalion, The London Regiment – joined in October 1915 and left in January 1916
1st Naval Brigade Field Ambulance Column, Royal Navy Medical Service

Commanders 
According to the November 1914 Naval List, the 'First Brigade' had an Honorary Colonel, the Admiral of the Fleet The Honourable John Fisher, Lord Fisher of Kilverstone .  It is unknown when (or if) he relinquished his appointment.

The first appointed commander was designated as the 'Brigade Commodore', but held the rank of Captain.  The first officer to hold this post was Wilfred Henderson.  Captain Henderson had previously been Royal Naval Attaché to the German Empire prior to the outbreak of the war.  He lost his post as brigade commander following the brigade's escape into the Netherlands.

At some point just before the end of the Siege of Antwerp, Colonel David Mercer  took command of the brigade.  Before this appointment, he had been Assistant Adjutant General of the Royal Marines (since September 1911).  On 22 January 1914, Mercer was promoted as Temporary Major General.  Mercer remained in command of the brigade, as Assistant Adjutant General until the brigade's disbandment in July 1916.  On 26 June 1916, Mercer was promoted to Adjutant General of the Royal Marines and subsequently promoted as a temporary Major General.

Uniform 
Although supporting troops of the Royal Naval Division wore the anchor divisional sign, in a variety of combinations of colours, it was not worn by the infantry.  They wore battle patches indicating the battalion, for example: Hawke, a black bird silhouette; Anson, a horizontal rectangle halved blue over light blue; Drake, a vertical rectangle halved blue (left) and light blue; Hood, a horizontal rectangle of light blue with a dark blue centre stripe; Royal Marines, a square of Corps ribbon; and Army units, either a title of a patch of regimental ribbon.

Below this patch was worn a square company patch: A Company was red, B Company was blue, C Company was yellow, and D Company was green.

Footnotes

Notes

Citations

References 

 
 
 

Infantry brigades of the British Army in World War I
Military units and formations established in 1914
Military units and formations disestablished in 1916
Military units and formations of the Royal Navy in World War I